Clavulina mussooriensis is a species of coral fungus in the family Clavulinaceae. The type species was collected in a cedar forest in India. The species resembles Clavulina cinerea, but differs in its brown color and emergent hyphae.

References

External links

Fungi described in 1958
Fungi of Asia
mussooriensis